Timila, thimila or paani, (Malayalam:തിമില) is an hour-glass shaped percussion instrument used in Kerala, South India. It is made of polished jackwood, and the drumheads made of calfskin (preferably taken from 1- to 2-year-old calf) are held together by leather braces which are also twined round the waist of the drum. This mechanism helps in adjusting the tension and controlling the sound, mainly two: 'tha' and 'thom'. It is one of the constituting instruments in Panchavadyam. It is also a major percussion instrument used in sree-bali, sree-bhootha-bali and related temple rites.

A Panchavadyam performance is begun with Timila Pattu and ends with the Timila Idachal thus making timila a very important component of the traditional Kerala percussion ensemble.

Construction and mechanics 

It has the shape of two cones kept in opposite direction i.e., an hour-glass like shape. The traditional size of thimila made of heart wood or fully grown jackwood (particularly varikka-plaavu) has a length of 24.k virals (one viral = 1.77 inches), 6 virals at ends and 2.5 virals at the centre, besides having a thickness of  viral (finger). The tun is hollow. Of late, presumably for reducing the weight, the measurements are changed without much loss in symphony. According to the procedure of manufacture, the tun of thimila is made in jackwood in the shape described above. Then the sides are made independently using rings (known as valayal) made up from climbers known as vennil-valli or manja-valli. The circumference of the rings is slightly more than that of the ends of the tun. The refined leather taken from a calf (between 1 and 2 years of age) is properly cut and fixed to these rings with the help of gum (made up of raw rice). The fixing of leather has to be done tightly as it determines the symphony of thimila. Six holes of size  viral each is made on either side and they are fixed to the tun with the help of twined leather threads (total requirement of thread is 25 feet). The tension of strings is very important as it is closely linked with the symphony. For suspending the thimila at the shoulders of the drummer a long cloth of 9 feet length and at least 6 inches width is used. In every respect it is an excellent masterpiece of art as it produces charming sounds.

Masters of Timila 

Among today's masters of timila are Kuzhoor Narayana Marar, Annamanada Parameswara Marar, Chandran Marar, Thrikkambaram Krishnankutty Marar, Karavattedath Narayana Marar, Koroth Ramakrishna Marar, Chottanikkara Vijayan, Parakkattu Thankappan, Nandappan, Ooramana Venu, Ooramana Rajan, Ooramana Aji, Kariyannur Narayanan Namboodiri, Kunissery Aniyan,  Kongad Vijayan, Kongad Madhu, Vaikom Chandran, Payyannur Balakrishna Marar, Kariyannur Narayanan Namboodiri, Pallashana murali marar, Keezhillam Gopalakrishnan, Peruvanam Krishnakumar...

Renowned timila exponents of the 20th century include Annamanada Achutha Marar, Parameswara Marar, Peethambara Marar, Chengamad Sekhara Kurup, Porathuveettil Nanu Marar, Pallavur Maniyan Marar, Perumbilly Narayana Marar, Kesava Marar, Pallippat Narayana Marar, Chottanikkara Narayana Marar, Bahuleyan, Pazhur Damodara Marar, Pallavur Kunhukutta Marar and Makkoth Sankarankutty Marar.

References

Indian musical instruments
Asian percussion instruments
Kerala music